Centreville, Nova Scotia could be the following places in Nova Scotia:

 Centreville, Cape Breton, Nova Scotia in the Cape Breton Regional Municipality
 Centreville, Digby, Nova Scotia in Digby County
 Centreville, Inverness County
 Centreville, Kings, Nova Scotia in Kings County
 Centreville, Shelburne, Nova Scotia in Shelburne County